South African Water Ski Federation (SAWSF) is the governing body for the sport of waterski in South Africa. It is affiliated to the world governing body International Waterski & Wakeboard Federation, and SASCOC.

SAWSF represent various disciplines such as barefoot, cable wakeboard, classic tournament waterskiing, show skiing, wakeboard, ski racing and disabled waterskiing.

See also
 Sport in South Africa

References

External links
 Official website
 

Water ski
Waterskiing
Wakeboarding